The Radeon 200 series is a series of graphics processors developed by AMD. These GPUs are manufactured on a 28 nm Gate-Last process through TSMC or Common Platform Alliance.

Release
The Rx 200 series was announced on September 25, 2013, at the AMD GPU14 Tech Day event. Non-disclosure agreements were lifted on October 15, except for the R9 290X, and pre-orders opened on October 3.

Architecture
 Graphics Core Next 3 (Volcanic Islands) is found on the R9 285 (Tonga Pro) branded products.
 Graphics Core Next 2 (Sea Islands) is found on R7 260 (Bonaire), R7 260X (Bonaire XTX), R9 290 (Hawaii Pro), R9 290X (Hawaii XT), and R9 295X2 (Vesuvius) branded products.
 Graphics Core Next 1 (Southern Islands) is found on R9 270, 270X, 280, 280X, R7 240, 250, 250X, 265, and R5 240 branded products.
 TeraScale 2 (VLIW5) (Northern Islands or Evergreen) is found on R5 235X and below branded products.
 OpenGL 4.x compliance requires supporting FP64 shaders. These are implemented by emulation on some TeraScale (microarchitecture) GPUs.
 Vulkan 1.0 requires GCN-Architecture. Vulkan 1.1 requires GCN 2 or higher.

Multi-monitor support

The AMD Eyefinity-branded on-die display controllers were introduced in September 2009 in the Radeon HD 5000 Series and have been present in all products since.

AMD TrueAudio

AMD TrueAudio was introduced with the AMD Radeon Rx 200 Series, but can only be found on the dies of GCN 2/3 products.

Video acceleration
AMD's SIP core for video acceleration, Unified Video Decoder and Video Coding Engine, are found on all GPUs and supported by AMD Catalyst and by the free and open-source graphics device driver.

Use in cryptocurrency mining
During 2014 the Radeon R9 200 series GPUs offered a very competitive price for usage in cryptocurrency mining. This led to limited supply and huge price increases of up to 164% over the MSRP in Q4 of 2013 and Q1 of 2014. Since Q2 of 2018 availability of AMD GPUs as well as pricing has, in most cases, returned to normal.

CrossFire Compatibility
Because many of the products in the range are rebadged versions of Radeon HD products, they remain compatible with the original versions when used in CrossFire mode. For example, the Radeon HD 7770 and Radeon R7 250X both use the 'Cape Verde XT' chip so have identical specifications and will work in CrossFire mode. This provides a useful upgrade option for anyone who owns an existing Radeon HD card and has a CrossFire compatible motherboard.

Virtual super resolution support
Starting with the driver release candidate version v14.501-141112a-177751E, officially named as Catalyst Omega, AMD's driver release introduced VSR on the R9 285 and R9 290 series graphics cards. This feature allows users to run games with higher image quality by rendering frames at above native resolution. Each frame is then downsampled to native resolution. This process is an alternative to supersampling which is not supported by all games. Virtual super resolution is similar to Dynamic Super Resolution, a feature available on competing nVidia graphics cards, but trades flexibility for increased performance. VSR can run at a resolution upwards of 2048 x 1536 at a 120 Hz refresh rate or 3840 x 2400 at 60 Hz.

OpenCL (API) 

OpenCL accelerates many scientific Software Packages against CPU up to factor 10 or 100 and more.
Open CL 1.0 to 1.2 are supported for all Chips with Terascale and GCN Architecture. OpenCL 2.0 is supported with GCN 2nd Gen. (or 1.2) and higher. For OpenCL 2.1 and 2.2 only Driver Updates are necessary with OpenCL 2.0 conformant Cards.

Vulkan (API) 

API Vulkan 1.0 is supported for all GCN architecture cards. Vulkan 1.2 requires GCN 2nd gen or higher with the Adrenalin 20.1 and Linux Mesa 20.0 drivers and newer.

Desktop models

Radeon R9 295X2
The Radeon R9 295X2 was released on April 21, 2014. It is a dual GPU card. Press samples were shipped in a metal case. It is the first reference card to utilize a closed looped liquid cooler. At 11.5 teraflops of computing power, the R9 295X2 was the most powerful dual-gpu consumer-oriented card in the world, until it was succeeded by the Radeon Pro Duo on April 26, 2016, which is essentially a combination of two R9 Fury X (Fiji XT) GPUs on a single card. The R9 295x2 has essentially two R9 290x (Hawaii XT) GPUs each with 4GB GDDR5 VRAM.

Radeon R9 290X

The Radeon R9 290X, codename "Hawaii XT", was released on October 24, 2013 and features 2816 Stream Processors, 176 TMUs, 64 ROPs, 512-bit wide buses, 44 CUs (compute units) and 8 ACE units. The R9 290X had a launch price of $549.

Radeon R9 290
The Radeon R9 290 and R9 290X were announced on September 25, 2013. The R9 290 is based on AMD's Hawaii Pro chip and R9 290X on Hawaii XT. R9 290 and R9 290X will support AMD TrueAudio, Mantle, Direct3D 11.2, and bridge-free Crossfire technology using XDMA. A limited "Battlefield 4 Edition" pre-order bundle of R9 290X that includes Battlefield 4 was available on October 3, 2013, with reported quantity being 8,000. The R9 290 had a launch price of $399.

Radeon R9 285
The Radeon R9 285 was announced on August 23, 2014 at AMD's 30 years of graphics celebration and released September 2, 2014. It was the first card to feature AMD's GCN 3 microarchitecture, in the form of a Tonga-series GPU.

Radeon R9 280X
Radeon R9 280X was announced on September 25, 2013. With a launch price of $299, it is based on the Tahiti XTL chip, being a slightly upgraded, rebranded Radeon HD 7970 GHz Edition.

Radeon R9 280
Radeon R9 280 was announced on March 4, 2014. With a launch MSRP set at $279, it is based on a rebranded Radeon HD 7950 with a slightly increased boost clock speed, from 925 MHz to 933 MHz.

Radeon R9 270X
Radeon R9 270X was announced on September 25, 2013. With a launch price of $199 (2 GB) and $229 (4 GB), it is based on the Curaçao XT chip, which was formerly called Pitcairn. It is speculated to be faster than a Radeon HD 7870 GHz edition. Radeon R9 270 has a launch price of $179.

Radeon R7 260X
Radeon R7 260X was announced on September 25, 2013. With a launch price of $139, it is based on the Bonaire XTX chip, a faster iteration of Bonaire XT that the Radeon HD 7790 is based on. It will have 2 GB of GDDR5 memory as standard and will also feature TrueAudio, on-chip audio DSP based on Tensilica HiFi EP architecture. The stock card features a boost clock of 1100 MHz. It has 2 GBs of GDDR5 memory with a 6.5 GHz memory clock over a 128-bit Interface. The 260X will draw around 115 W in typical use.

Radeon R7 250
Radeon R7 250 was announced on September 25, 2013. It has a launch price of $89. The card is based on the Oland core with 384 GCN cores. On February 10, 2014, AMD announced the R7 250X which is based on the Cape Verde GPU with 640 GCN cores and an MSRP of $99.

Chipset table

Desktop models

Mobile models

Radeon Feature Matrix

Graphics device drivers

AMD's proprietary graphics device driver "Catalyst"

AMD Catalyst is being developed for Microsoft Windows and Linux. As of July 2014, other operating system are not officially supported. This may be different for the AMD FirePro brand, which is based on identical hardware but features OpenGL-certified graphics device drivers.

AMD Catalyst supports of course all features advertised for the Radeon brand.

Free and open-source graphics device driver "Radeon"

The free and open-source drivers are primarily developed on Linux and for Linux, but have been ported to other operating systems as well. Each driver is composed out of five parts:

 Linux kernel component DRM
 Linux kernel component KMS driver: basically the device driver for the display controller
 user-space component libDRM
 user-space component in Mesa 3D;
 a special and distinct 2D graphics device driver for X.Org Server, which if finally about to be replaced by Glamor

The free and open-source "Radeon" graphics driver supports most of the features implemented into the Radeon line of GPUs. Unlike the nouveau project for Nvidia graphics cards, the open-source "Radeon" drivers are not reverse engineered, but based on documentation released by AMD.

See also 
 AMD FirePro
 AMD FireMV
 AMD FireStream
 List of AMD graphics processing units

References

External links
 TechPowerUp! GPU Database
 AMD Radeon R9 Series Graphics
 AMD Radeon R7 Series Graphics
 GPU14 Tech Day Public Presentation.pdf
 AMD Announces FirePro W9100 

AMD graphics cards
Computer-related introductions in 2013
Graphics processing units
Graphics cards